Nell Carter (born Nell Ruth Hardy; September 13, 1948 – January 23, 2003) was an American singer and actress.

Carter began her career in 1970, singing in the theater, and later crossed over to television. She was best known for her role as Nell Harper on the sitcom Gimme a Break! which originally aired from 1981 to 1987. Carter received two Emmy and two Golden Globe award nominations for her work on the series. Prior to Gimme a Break!, Carter won a Tony Award for Best Performance by a Featured Actress in a Musical in 1978 for her performance in the Broadway musical Ain't Misbehavin' as well as a Primetime Emmy Award for her reprisal of the role on television in 1982.

Early life
Nell Ruth Hardy was born September 13, 1948 in Birmingham, Alabama,  one of nine children born to Edna Mae and Horace Hardy. She was born into a Roman Catholic family and raised Presbyterian. Carter self-identified as Pentecostal.

When she was only two years old, her father was electrocuted when he stepped on a live power line in full view of Nell.

As a child, she began singing on a local gospel radio show and was also a member of the church choir. At age 15 she began performing at area coffee houses, and later joined the Renaissance Ensemble that played at area coffee houses and gay bars.

On July 5, 1965, 16-year-old Hardy was raped at gunpoint by a man she knew who gave her a ride home from a performance. She became pregnant and gave birth to daughter Tracy the next year; finding raising a baby alone too difficult, she sent her child to live with her older sister Willie. She later claimed that Tracy was the product of a brief marriage, but she revealed the truth in a 1994 interview.

Career

Broadway work
At age 19, Hardy changed her surname to Carter and left Birmingham, Alabama, moving to New York City with the Renaissance Ensemble. In New York City, Carter sang in coffee shops, nightclubs and bathhouses (including the Continental Baths), then landed her first role on Broadway in 1971.

Carter made her Broadway debut in the 1971 rock opera Soon, which closed after three performances. She was the music director for the 1974 Westbeth Playwrights Feminist Collective's production of "What Time of Night It Is". Carter appeared with Bette Davis in the 1974 stage musical Miss Moffat, based on Davis' earlier film The Corn Is Green. The show closed before making it to Broadway. She broke into stardom in the musical Ain't Misbehavin, for which she won a Tony Award in 1978. She later won an Emmy for the same role in a televised performance in 1982.

In 1978, Carter was cast as Effie White in the Broadway musical Dreamgirls, but departed the production during development to take a television role on Ryan's Hope. (When Dreamgirls premiered in late 1981, Jennifer Holliday had taken over the lead.)

Additional Broadway credits included Dude and Annie.

Film and Television
In 1979, she had a part in the Miloš Forman-directed musical daptation of Hair. Her vocal talents are showcased throughout the soundtrack.

In 1981, Carter took a role on television's The Misadventures of Sheriff Lobo, then landed the lead role of Nell Harper on the sitcom Gimme a Break!.

Gimme a Break!

Nell Carter would become perhaps best known to audiences for her lead role in the NBC television series Gimme a Break!, in which she played the role of a housekeeper for a widowed police chief (Dolph Sweet) and his three daughters. The show was a rating hit for NBC and earned Carter nominations for a Golden Globe and an Emmy Award. 137 episodes of Gimme a Break! were produced over a run of six seasons, airing from 1981 to 1987.

In August 1987, after the cancellation of Gimme a Break!, Carter returned to the nightclub circuit with a five-month national tour with comedian Joan Rivers.

Further TV work
In 1989, she shot a pilot for NBC titled Morton's by the Bay, which aired as a one-time special that May; Carter played the assistant to a banquet-hall owner, and the focus was on her and her madcap staff. NBC passed on the series development. That October, she performed "The Star-Spangled Banner" before Game 4 of the 1989 World Series in San Francisco.

In 1990, Carter starred in the CBS comedy You Take the Kids. The series, which was perceived as being the black answer to Roseanne due to its portrayal of a working-class African-American family, featured Carter as a crass, no-nonsense mother and wife.
You Take the Kids faced poor ratings and reviews, and had a month's run from December 1990 to January 1991. 
During the early 1990s, Carter appeared in low-budget movies, TV specials, and game shows such as Match Game '90 and To Tell the Truth. She co-starred in Hangin' with Mr. Cooper from 1993 to 1995.

In the mid-1990s, Carter appeared on Broadway in a revival of Annie as Miss Hannigan. She was upset when commercials promoting the show used a different actress, white actress Marcia Lewis, as Miss Hannigan. The producers stated that the commercials, which were made during an earlier production, were too costly to reshoot. Carter said racism played a part in the decision. "Maybe they don't want audiences to know Nell Carter is black", she told the New York Post. "It hurts a lot", Carter told the Post, "I've asked them nicely to stop it—it's insulting to me as a black woman." Carter later was replaced by Sally Struthers.

Later years
In 2001, she appeared as a special guest-star on the pilot episode of  Reba and continued with the show, making three appearances in season one. The following year, Carter made two appearances on Ally McBeal.

The next year had her rehearsing for a production of Raisin, a stage musical of A Raisin in the Sun in Long Beach, California, and filming  Swing. Carter's final onscreen appearance was in the comedy film Back by Midnight. It was released in 2005, two years after her death.

Death
On January 23, 2003, Carter, aged 54, collapsed and died at her home in Beverly Hills;  her son Joshua discovered her body that night. Per a provision in Carter's will, no autopsy was performed. Using blood tests, X-rays, and a cursory physical examination, the Los Angeles County Coroner's Office ruled that Carter's death was the likely result of "probable arteriosclerotic heart disease, with diabetes a contributing condition".

Carter was survived by her partner Ann Kaser, who inherited her property and custody of her two sons. She is buried at Hillside Memorial Park Cemetery in Los Angeles.

Personal life
Carter attempted suicide in the early 1980s, and around 1985 she entered a drug detoxification facility to break a long-standing cocaine addiction. Her brother Bernard died of complications due to AIDS in 1989.

Carter married mathematician and lumber executive George Krynicki, and she converted to Judaism in 1982. She filed for divorce from Krynicki in 1989; the divorce was finalized in 1992.

Carter had three children: daughter Tracy and sons Joshua and Daniel. She adopted both Joshua and Daniel as newborns over a four-month period. She attempted to adopt twice more, but both adoptions failed. In her first attempt, she allowed a young pregnant woman to move into her home with the plan that she would adopt the child, but the mother decided to keep her baby. In 1992, Carter had surgery to repair two aneurysms and married Roger Larocque in June. She divorced Larocque the next year. Carter declared bankruptcy in 1995 and again in 2002. She also had three miscarriages.

Stage credits
Soon (1971), Broadway
The Wedding of Iphigenia (1971), Off-Broadway
Dude (1972), Broadway
Miss Moffat (1974), closed on the road
Be Kind to People Week (1975), Off-Broadway
Tom Eyen's Dirtiest Musical (1975), Off-Broadway
Don't Bother Me, I Can't Cope (1976), San Francisco
Ain't Misbehavin' (1978), Manhattan Theatre Club, Broadway and U.S. national tour
One Night Only (1979), workshop
Black Broadway (1979), Avery Fisher Hall
Black Broadway (1980), The Town Hall
Ain't Misbehavin' (1988), Broadway
Hello, Dolly! (1991), Long Beach Civic Light Opera
Annie (1997), Broadway and U.S. national tour
South Pacific (2001), Pittsburgh Civic Light Opera
The Vagina Monologues (2001), Madison Square Garden

Filmography

Film

Television

Awards

References

External links

 
 
 

1948 births
2003 deaths
20th-century American actresses
20th-century American singers
20th-century American women singers
21st-century American actresses
Actresses from Beverly Hills, California
Actresses from Birmingham, Alabama
African-American actresses
20th-century African-American women singers
African-American feminists
African-American former Christians
African-American Jews
American feminists
American film actresses
American former Christians
American musical theatre actresses
American stage actresses
American television actresses
American voice actresses
Bisexual actresses
Bisexual feminists
Bisexual musicians
Burials at Hillside Memorial Park Cemetery
Converts to Judaism from Christianity
Deaths from diabetes
Drama Desk Award winners
LGBT people from Alabama
LGBT African Americans
Feminist musicians
Former Presbyterians
Musicians from Beverly Hills, California
Musicians from Birmingham, Alabama
Obie Award recipients
Primetime Emmy Award winners
Singers from California
Theatre World Award winners
Tony Award winners
20th-century American LGBT people
21st-century American LGBT people
21st-century African-American women
21st-century African-American people
American LGBT actors